Excello is a census designated place (CDP) in southern Macon County, Missouri, United States. It is located approximately eight miles south of Macon and fifteen miles north of Moberly, one-half mile west of U.S. Route 63 on State Road T.

An early variant name was "Emerson". A post office called Excello has been in operation since 1869.

Demographics

References

Census-designated places in Missouri